Pietro Fittipaldi da Cruz (born 25 June 1996) is a Brazilian-American racing driver, the grandson of two-time Formula One world champion Emerson Fittipaldi and brother of racing driver Enzo Fittipaldi. Fittipaldi is racing in European Le Mans Series for Inter Europol Competition, alongside serving as a test and reserve driver for Formula One team Haas. He made his Formula One debut with Haas at the 2020 Sakhir Grand Prix, replacing the injured Romain Grosjean, becoming the fourth member of the Fittipaldi family to race in Formula One.

Career

NASCAR Whelen All-American Series 
Fittipaldi began his racing career in the NASCAR Whelen All-American Series, winning the track championship at Hickory Motor Speedway in 2011. In 2012 he won one race and finished fifth in the championship.

Lower formulae 
The Brazilian moved to Europe to pursue a career in open-wheeled racing in 2013, making his debut in the BRDC Formula 4 Championship and Protyre Formula Renault Championship In 2014, he won the latter series, clinching the title with one race remaining.

FIA Formula 3 European Championship 
In 2015 Fittipaldi competed in the FIA Formula 3 European Championship for Fortec Motorsports. With a best result of sixth at two of the races at Algarve, Fittipaldi finished 16th in the championship standings with 32 points.

Formula V8 3.5 Series 
Fittipaldi continued racing for Fortec in 2016, this time driving in the Formula V8 3.5 Series alongside fellow rookie Louis Delétraz. However, he only scored one podium and ended up 10th in the standings, eight positions behind his teammate.

Nevertheless, he continued competing in the World Series, this time with Lotus. He won six races, dominating the championship, 44 points ahead of his closest rival Matevos Isaakyan.

IndyCar Series 
In February 2018, Fittipaldi was named a part-time driver of the No. 19 Honda for Dale Coyne Racing in the IndyCar Series, replacing Zachary Claman DeMelo in six races that year. He made his debut at the Phoenix Grand Prix, where he was forced to retire after contact on lap 40. He achieved his first top ten finish at Portland and finished 26th in the standings.

Fittipaldi is scheduled to return to IndyCar in 2021 exclusively for oval races, replacing Romain Grosjean who will only enter road and street circuit rounds.

World Endurance Championship 
In May 2018 Fittipaldi broke both legs in a crash during qualifying for the World Endurance Championship 6 Hours of Spa-Francorchamps race.

Deutsche Tourenwagen Masters 
Fittipaldi raced for Audi Sport Team WRT in the 2019 Deutsche Tourenwagen Masters. He scored a best result of fifth at Misano, and finished in the points six times, scoring 22 and ended up 15th in the drivers' standings.

Formula One 
In October 2014, Fittipaldi was one of four drivers to be invited to test for the Ferrari Driver Academy. He first tested a Formula One car on 27 November 2018 during the post-season test at the Yas Marina Circuit, driving for Haas.

In November 2018, the Haas F1 Team confirmed Pietro Fittipaldi as its official 2019 test driver. Haas announced that the Brazilian would test the car at the first pre-season test at Barcelona in February 2019. In April 2019 Fittipaldi took part in the 2019 Bahrain Young Driver Test, before then making an appearance at the mid-season test at Catalunya.

On 30 November 2020, it was announced that Fittipaldi would race for Haas in the 2020 Sakhir Grand Prix, replacing the injured Romain Grosjean who was hospitalised after an accident at the 2020 Bahrain Grand Prix in which he suffered burns to his hands and ankles. This made him the first grandson of a Formula One driver to become a Formula One driver himself. Fittipaldi started his debut Grand Prix in last and finished the race 17th, the last of the remaining drivers. Haas team principal Guenther Steiner commented on Fittipaldi's debut "I think Pietro did a great job, considering he drove the car for the last time a year ago". Fittipaldi remarked that it is difficult for a driver to make it to Formula One, and he was glad to have finished his first race.

He again stood in for Grosjean at the season finale in Abu Dhabi. Fittipaldi qualified 19th and was elevated to 17th on the grid due to other drivers collecting penalties. In the race, he suffered a slow pit stop and again finished last of the running drivers in 19th place. In February 2021 it was confirmed that he would remain in his role as a Haas test and reserve driver for the 2021 season.

He was retained in the role for the  season. He drove the Haas VF-22 during the first day of 2022 pre-season testing at the Bahrain International Circuit, substituting for Nikita Mazepin after Mazepin's contract was terminated. Fittipaldi was replaced for the remainder of the test by Kevin Magnussen. Fittipaldi was actively considered by Haas for Mazepin's seat in the race team but ultimately Magnussen was chosen over him.

Fittipaldi drove the VF-22 in the free practices of the Mexico City and Abu Dhabi Grands Prix and also took part in post-season testing in Abu Dhabi. 

Haas retained Fittipaldi's roles for the  season.

Racing record

Karting career summary

Racing career summary 

† Fittipaldi did not win the national championship; he was the individual track champion of Hickory Motor Speedway.
‡ As Fittipaldi was a guest driver, he was ineligible for championship points.
* Season still in progress.

Single seater racing results

Complete Protyre Formula Renault Championship results
(key) (Races in bold indicate pole position; races in italics indicate fastest lap)

Complete FIA Formula 3 European Championship results 
(key) (Races in bold indicate pole position) (Races in italics indicate fastest lap)

Complete World Series Formula V8 3.5 results
(key) (Races in bold indicate pole position; races in italics indicate fastest lap)

† Driver did not finish, but was classified as he completed over 90% of the race distance.

Complete IndyCar Series results
(key) (Races in bold indicate pole position) (Races in italics indicate fastest lap)

* Season still in progress.

Indianapolis 500

Complete Super Formula results
(key) (Races in bold indicate pole position) (Races in italics indicate fastest lap)

Complete F3 Asian Championship results
(key) (Races in bold indicate pole position) (Races in italics indicate fastest lap)

Complete Formula One results 
(key) (Races in bold indicate pole position; races in italics indicate fastest lap)

Sports car racing results

Complete 24 Hours of Le Mans results

Complete FIA World Endurance Championship results

† As Fittipaldi was a guest driver, he was ineligible for points.* Season still in progress.

Complete European Le Mans Series results
(key) (Races in bold indicate pole position; results in italics indicate fastest lap)

Complete Deutsche Tourenwagen Masters results

Complete IMSA SportsCar Championship Results
(key) (Races in bold indicate pole position; races in italics indicate fastest lap)

† Points only counted towards the Michelin Endurance Cup, and not the overall LMP2 Championship.
* Season still in progress.

References

External links
 
 

Living people
1996 births
Racing drivers from Miami
Brazilian racing drivers
Formula Renault 2.0 Alps drivers
Brazilian IndyCar Series drivers
Formula Renault Eurocup drivers
FIA Institute Young Driver Excellence Academy drivers
FIA Formula 3 European Championship drivers
MRF Challenge Formula 2000 Championship drivers
World Series Formula V8 3.5 drivers
IndyCar Series drivers
FIA World Endurance Championship drivers
Super Formula drivers
Pietro Fittipaldi
Brazilian Deutsche Tourenwagen Masters drivers
Brazilian Formula One drivers
Haas Formula One drivers
F3 Asian Championship drivers
Indianapolis 500 drivers
Koiranen GP drivers
Charouz Racing System drivers
Dale Coyne Racing drivers
Team LeMans drivers
W Racing Team drivers
Team Rosberg drivers
Pinnacle Motorsport drivers
G-Drive Racing drivers
Stock Car Brasil drivers
24 Hours of Le Mans drivers
NASCAR drivers
Fortec Motorsport drivers
Formula Renault BARC drivers
Audi Sport drivers
DragonSpeed drivers
WeatherTech SportsCar Championship drivers
Jota Sport drivers